Ruwen Filus is a German table tennis player who plays for German club TTC RhönSprudel Fulda-Maberzell in the German Tischtennis-Bundesliga.

Career

2021 
In March, Filus played in WTT Doha. In the WTT Star Contender event, he upset Jang Woojin in the round of 32, Jun Mizutani in the round of 16, Lin Yun-Ju in the quarter-finals, and Darko Jorgić in the semi-finals en route to an impressive surprise run to the finals. He lost to Tomokazu Harimoto 4-2  in the finals.

Singles titles

Style 
Filus is a chopper that uses long pips on the backhand and a defensive Joo Se Hyuk blade; however, he actually tends to win many of his points on offensive shots.

Personal life
Filus married Verena Petri in June 2013. He has two daughters.

References

External links

1988 births
Living people
German male table tennis players
People from Bückeburg
Sportspeople from Lower Saxony